Football Sidelines is a TV sports program broadcast on the DuMont Television Network from October 6 to December 22, 1952 and hosted by Harry Wismer. The program was 15 minutes long, and aired on Mondays at 9:30pm ET, followed by Famous Fights From Madison Square Garden at 9:45pm.

Episode status
As with most DuMont series, no episodes are known to exist.

See also
List of programs broadcast by the DuMont Television Network
List of surviving DuMont Television Network broadcasts
1952-53 United States network television schedule
Football This Week
Pro Football Highlights

References

Bibliography
David Weinstein, The Forgotten Network: DuMont and the Birth of American Television (Philadelphia: Temple University Press, 2004) 
Alex McNeil, Total Television, Fourth edition (New York: Penguin Books, 1980) 
Tim Brooks and Earle Marsh, The Complete Directory to Prime Time Network TV Shows, Third edition (New York: Ballantine Books, 1964)

External links
Football Sidelines at IMDB
DuMont historical website

1952 American television series debuts
1952 American television series endings
Black-and-white American television shows
National Football League on television
Lost television shows
DuMont sports programming